"Here Always" is a song recorded by Seungmin, a member of Stray Kids, serving as the seventh original soundtrack of the 2021 South Korean television series, Hometown Cha-Cha-Cha. It was released digitally on October 10, 2021, through Stone Music Entertainment, as Seungmin's first solo song.

Background and release

"Here Always" was featured for the first time in episodes 10 and 11 of Hometown Cha-Cha-Cha, aired on September 26 and October 2, 2021, respectively, where Yoon Hye-jin (Shin Min-a) confesses her heart to Hong Du-sik (Kim Seon-ho) and they kiss each other. Later, the song was confirmed to release on October 10 to digital music and streaming platforms, alongside the accompanying music video, featuring scenes from the series and shots of Seungmin performing the song in a recording studio.

Composition

Written by NieN (Jeong Gu-hyun), and Aseul, "Here Always" is described as a slow-tempo acoustic lo-fi pop ballad song driven by "tender" piano with "rough" yet "emotionally-stimulating unique" voice. It was composed in the key of D major, 82 beats per minute with a running time of four minutes and fourteen seconds.

Commercial performance

Upon its release, "Here Always" entered South Korea's Gaon Digital Chart at number 125 for the chart issue dated October 10–17, 2021. On its component charts, the song landed at number 13 on the Download Chart, number 182 on the Streaming Chart, and number 8 on the BGM Chart. "Here Always" also peaked at number 8 on both Hungarian Single Top 40, and Billboard World Digital Song Sales.

Track listing

 Digital download / streaming
 "Here Always" – 4:14
 "Here Always" (instrumental) – 4:14

Credits and personnel

Credits adapted from YouTube.

Locations
 Studio 1074 – digital editing, recording
 Doobdoob Studio – recording
 Kokosound Studio – mixing
 SoundMax – mastering

Personnel
 Seungmin – vocals
 NieN (Jeong Gu-hyeon) – lyrics, composition, arrangement, piano, guitar, bass, chorus, digital editing, recording
 Aseul – lyrics
 Kwon Yu-jin – recording
 Go Hyun-jeong – mixing
 Park Joon – mastering
 Do Jeong-hee – mastering

Charts

Release history

Notes

References

2021 songs
2021 singles
Korean-language songs
South Korean television drama theme songs